Gilberto Gil (also commonly referred to as Gilberto Gil (Cérebro Eletrônico) to differentiate it from Gil's other self-titled releases) is the third solo album by Gilberto Gil, originally released in 1969. The album was arranged by Rogério Duprat, and has a strong element of psychedelic rock to it, being considered by some to be his most experimental album. Since Gil was not allowed by the Brazilian military dictatorship to leave Salvador, Bahia, before being exiled to London, he recorded vocals and acoustic guitar in Salvador, and Rogério Duprat recorded the other instruments in Rio de Janeiro and São Paulo.

The album has one of Gilberto Gil's most famous songs, "Aquele Abraço".

Track listing

References

Gilberto Gil albums
1969 albums
Philips Records albums